Isabella I (1172 – 5 April 1205) was reigning Queen of Jerusalem from 1190 to her death in 1205. She was the daughter of Amalric I of Jerusalem and his second wife Maria Comnena, a Byzantine princess. Her half-brother, Baldwin IV of Jerusalem, engaged her to Humphrey IV of Toron. Her mother's second husband, Balian of Ibelin, and his stepfather, Raynald of Châtillon, were influential members of the two baronial parties. The marriage of Isabella and Humphrey was celebrated in Kerak Castle in autumn 1183. Saladin, the Ayyubid sultan of Egypt and Syria, laid siege to the fortress during the wedding, but Baldwin IV forced him to lift the siege.

Baldwin IV, who suffered from lepromatous leprosy, had made his nephew (the only son of his sister, Sibylla by her first husband), Baldwin V, his heir and co-ruler, to prevent Sibylla's second husband, Guy of Lusignan, from mounting the throne. The High Court of Jerusalem stipulated that a committee of Western European rulers was entitled to choose between Sibylla and Isabella to succeed Baldwin V if he died before reaching the age of majority, but Sibylla and Guy of Lusignan were crowned soon after Baldwin V died in 1185. Guy's opponents tried to play Isabella and her husband off against him, but Humphrey did homage to the royal couple.

Early life

Childhood 

Isabella was the daughter of Amalric, King of Jerusalem, by his second wife, Maria Comnena. Maria Comnena (who was a grandniece of the Byzantine Emperor, Manuel I Komnenos) married Amalric on 29 August 1167. Isabella was born before September 1172.

Amalric died unexpectedly on 11 July 1174. His son by his first marriage, Baldwin IV, was crowned king two weeks later. Before long, it became obvious that Baldwin suffered from lepromatous leprosy. To secure the succession of the ailing king, his sister, Sibylla, was given in marriage to William of Montferrat in November 1176, but he died seven months later. Baldwin's cousin, Philip I, Count of Flanders, who landed at Acre in August, offered Robert of Bethune for Sibylla's new husband, also proposing that Isabella (who was Baldwin's and Sibylla's half-sister) should marry Robert's younger brother, William of Bethune. The High Court of Jerusalem refused both proposals.

Isabella's mother married Balian of Ibelin in autumn 1177. His brother, Baldwin of Ibelin, wanted to marry Sibylla, but the king preferred another candidate, Guy of Lusignan. After the marriage of Sibylla and Guy on Easter 1180, a division emerged between Guy of Lusignan's supporters and opponents. The first group included the mother of Baldwin IV and Sibylla, Agnes of Courtenay, her brother, Joscelin, and Raynald of Châtillon, Lord of Oultrejordain. Their opponents included Isabella's mother and stepfather, and Raymond III of Tripoli. To secure Guy's position, the king arranged the betrothal of Isabella to Raynald of Châtillon's stepson, Humphrey IV of Toron in October 1180. Isabella was sent to Kerak Castle to be educated by Humphrey's mother, Stephanie of Milly. Stephanie forbade her to pay visits to her mother and stepfather at Nablus.

The relationship between Baldwin IV and Guy of Lusignan deteriorated. Baldwin IV removed Guy from the regency and denied his right of succession, making Guy's stepson (Sibylla's son from her first marriage), Baldwin V, his heir and co-ruler on 20 November 1183. A version of Ernoul's chronicle suggests that the child Baldwin V was made heir, because the ailing Baldwin IV wanted to avoid a debate between his sisters' supporters about his succession. Guy's principal supporters, Joscelin of Courtenay and Raynald of Châtillon, were not present at Baldwin V's coronation, because they attended the wedding of Isabella and Humphrey of Toron.

First marriage 

The wedding took place in Kerak Castle. Saladin, the Ayyubid sultan of Egypt and Syria laid siege to the fortress. According to Ernoul's chronicle, Stephanie of Milly sent meals to the besiegers from the feast and Saladin forbade his engineers to destroy the tower of the fortress in which Humphrey and Isabella spent the wedding night. Baldwin IV assembled a relief army and departed from Jerusalem to Kerak, although he was unable to ride a horse. Saladin lifted the siege and retreated without fight on 3 or 4 December.

The dying Baldwin IV appointed Raymond of Tripoli regent for Baldwin V in April 1185. On Raymond's demand, the High Court of Jerusalem ruled that a committee consisting of the pope, the Holy Roman Emperor and the kings of France and England would be entitled to choose between Sibylla and Isabella if Baldwin V died before reaching the age of majority. Baldwin IV died on 16 March 1185. About a year and a half later (before mid-September 1186) the child Baldwin V also died.

Sibylla's uncle Joscelin of Courtenay persuaded Raymond III of Tripoli and his allies to leave Jerusalem, and urged her supporters (including Raynald of Châtillon) to assemble in the town. Ignoring the 1185 ruling of the High Court, the noblemen and prelates who came to Jerusalem concluded that Sibylla was the lawful heir to her son. Those who were opposed to Sibylla (including Raymond III of Tripoli and Balian of Ibelin) assembled in Nablus. They argued that Sibylla's legitimacy was dubious, because her parents' marriage had been annulled. They also emphasized that Isabella was born after the coronation of her father. They sent envoys to Jerusalem to protest against Sibylla's coronation, but Heraclius, Latin Patriarch of Jerusalem, crowned her in mid-September. Heraclius also anointed Guy of Lusignan king after she placed a crown on Guy's head.

On Raymond of Tripoli's proposal, the noblemen who assembled in Nablus decided that they proclaim Isabella and Humphrey of Toron queen and king. However, Humphrey (whose mother and stepfather were Sibylla's supporters) fled from Nablus to Jerusalem and did homage to Sibylla and Guy. Before long, all barons followed his example and swore fealty to the queen and her husband, with the exception of Raymond of Tripoli who left the kingdom.

Saladin imposed a crushing defeat on the united army of the Kingdom of Jerusalem in the Battle of Hattin on 4 July 1187. Isabella's husband was captured on the battlefield. Before long, Saladin's troops seized most towns and fortresses of the Kingdom of Jerusalem: Tiberias fell soon after the battle, Acre on 9 July, Beirut before 6 August, and Jerusalem on 2 October. Tyre was an exception, holding out for months under the command of Conrad of Montferrat who had come to the Holy Land from Italy a few weeks after the battle.

Conrad regarded himself the ruler of Tyre, forbidding Guy of Lusignan to enter the town in summer 1189. Guy laid siege to Acre, but James of Avesnes, Louis III of Thuringia and other crusader commanders who came to the Holy Land also questioned his claim to leadership. Guy's wife, Sibylla, and their two daughters died in autumn 1190. Guy's opponents argued that he had only been king by marriage, and his wife's half-sister, Isabella, inherited the crown. Guy did not want to abandon his claim to the Kingdom of Jerusalem. Taking advantage of the situation, Conrad of Montferrat decided to marry Isabella.

Isabella's stepfather supported Conrad's plan. Isabella resisted, but her mother put her under pressure. Maria Komnena also swore that Baldwin IV had forced the eight-year-old Isabella to marry Humphrey of Toron, whose effeminacy was well known. Before long, the papal legate, Ubaldo Lanfranchi, Archbishop of Pisa, and Philip of Dreux, Bishop of Beauvais, annulled the marriage of Isabella and Humphrey. Baldwin of Forde, Archbishop of Canterbury, forbade her to marry Conrad, stating that both Isabella and Conrad would commit adultery if they married. However, Baldwin of Forde died on 19 November 1190.

Second marriage 

Conrad married Isabella on 24 November. Isabella returned to Humphrey the Lordship of Toron that Baldwin IV had annexed to the crown in 1180. Guy of Lusignan refused to abdicate, but most barons regarded him as the lawful monarch. Conrad and Isabella returned to Tyre. After Philip II of France, who landed at Acre on 20 April 1191, acknowledged Conrad's claim to Jerusalem, Guy of Lusignan and Conrad's opponents (including Humphrey of Toron and Bohemond III of Antioch) sought assistance from Richard I of England, who decided to support them. Guy adopted the title of "king-elect of Jerusalem" in May.

The crusaders captured Acre on 11 July 1191. On 28 July, Richard and Philip agreed that Guy could retain the title of king till the end of his life, but Conrad would rule Tyre, Beirut and Sidon; after Guy's death, the kingdom would be united under the rule of Conrad and Isabella or their issue. Three days later, Philip left for France and Richard became the sole supreme commander of the crusaders. The native barons remained hostile towards Guy. After Richard decided to return to England in April 1192, the barons urged him to revise the previous decision about the Kingdom of Jerusalem.

Reign

Election 

Richard held an assembly on 16 April 1192. The prelates and the noblemen who attended the meeting unanimously voted for Conrad. Richard accepted their decision, granting Cyprus to Guy in compensation for his lost kingdom. Richard dispatched his nephew Count Henry II of Champagne to inform Conrad about the barons' decision. Henry arrived at Tyre about four days later. It was agreed that Conrad and Isabella would be crowned at Acre.

Isabella, who loved lingering in her bath, spent unusually much time there on 28 April. Being hungry, Conrad decided to have a dinner with Philip of Dreux, but by the time he arrived at Philip's house, the bishop had already finished his meal. Conrad wanted to return home, but two men ambushed and stabbed him in a narrow street. Most sources agree that they were sent by Rashid ad-Din Sinan, head of the Assassins. While dying, Conrad ordered Isabella not to give Tyre to anyone but Richard or to the new king of Jerusalem. When Duke Hugh III of Burgundy, the French king's lieutenant in the Holy Land, urged Isabella to deliver Tyre to him, she shut herself up in the fortress and refused to open its gates.

Third marriage 

On learning of Conrad's assassination, Henry of Champagne, who had meanwhile returned to Acre, hurried back to Tyre. Henry, who was the nephew of both Richard of England and Philip of France, was acclaimed king by the barons and the citizens of Tyre. According to Ernoul, Henry was hesitant, because Isabella was pregnant, possibly with a son. The barons and the citizens, continued Ernoul, promised him that his children would inherit the Kingdom of Jerusalem to convince him to accept the crown. The betrothal of Henry and Isabella was announced two days after Conrad's death. The marriage was celebrated in Acre on 10 May 1192.

Imad ad-Din al-Isfahani, who was present for the wedding, wrote:

Isabella and Conrad's child, Maria of Montferrat, was born in 1192. Henry and Isabella then had three daughters, Margaret (born 1193/1194), Alice (born 1196) and Philippa (born 1197). Henry died in 1197 when a balcony or window-trellis gave way and he fell out of a window.

Fourth marriage 
After his death, Isabella married for a fourth time to Aimery of Cyprus, brother of Guy of Lusignan. They were crowned together as King and Queen of Jerusalem in January 1198 in Acre. They had two daughters, Sibylla (born 1198) and Melisende (born 1200), and one son, Amalric (born 1201). King Aimery died in 1205 of food poisoning caused by white mullet, four days before his wife, and shortly after their son. On her death on 5 April 1205, Isabella was succeeded as queen by her eldest daughter Maria.

The legality of Isabella's divorce from Humphrey was challenged in 1213, during the dispute over the succession to Champagne between her daughters Alice and Philippa and Henry's nephew Theobald IV. However, its validity seems to have been upheld: no challenge was made to the legitimacy of Maria and her descendants to succeed to the throne of Jerusalem, and in Champagne, Theobald bought off his cousins Alice and Philippa.

Family 

Isabella's first marriage to Humphrey IV of Toron was childless.

From her second marriage to Conrad of Montferrat she had one daughter:
Maria (1192–1212), succeeded Isabella as Queen of Jerusalem.

From her third marriage to Henry II, Count of Champagne she had three daughters:
Marguerite (1193/1194 – before 1205) betrothed to Guy of Cyprus but they both died as children.
Alice (1195/1196–1246), firstly married Hugh I of Cyprus, secondly she married Bohemond V of Antioch and thirdly married Raoul de Soissons. She was a rival claimant of Champagne.
Philippa (c. 1197 - 20 December 1250), married Erard de Brienne-Ramerupt and was also a claimant of Champagne.

From her fourth and final marriage to Aimery of Cyprus she had the following children:
 Sibylle (October–November 1198 – c. 1230 or 1252), married King Leo I of Armenia 
 Mélisende (c. 1200 – aft. 1249), married 1 January, 1218 Bohemund IV of Antioch 
 Amalric (1201 – 2 February, 1205, Acre)

Ancestry

In popular culture 

Isabella has made few fictional appearances, but she is a major character in Graham Shelby's The Knights of Dark Renown (1969) and its sequel The Kings of Vain Intent (1970). Shelby idealises her marriage to Humphrey, depicting them as his young romantic leads. He then goes on to depict her being beaten and raped by Conrad in a sadistically abusive relationship. This sensationalist depiction is not supported by any evidence. Shelby implies that Isabella plotted Conrad's murder in revenge for his abuse, and depicts her as mentally numbed and indifferent to Henry.

She is the title character of Alan Gordon's mystery novel, The Widow of Jerusalem (2003), which paints a more sympathetic portrait of her marriage to Conrad. She is introduced as a spoilt, vain young woman, but she matures in the course of the story. Only when it is too late does she realise that her husband loves her. His murder, and the later death of Henry, are investigated by the hero, the fool Theophilos (Feste).

She is positively portrayed as a child and young woman in Sharon Kay Penman's The Land Beyond The Sea.

See also 
Third Crusade
War of the Succession of Champagne

References

Sources 

 
 
 
 
 
 

 
 
 
 
 
 Edbury, Peter W. (ed.) The Conquest of Jerusalem and the Third Crusade, 1998, 
 Gilchrist, M. M. "Character-assassination: Conrad de Montferrat in English-language fiction & popular histories", Bollettino del Marchesato. Circolo Culturale I Marchesi del Monferrato, Alessandria, no. 6, Nov. 2005, pp.5–13. (external link)
 Ilgen, Theodor. Konrad, Markgraf von Montferrat, 1880
 Nicholson, Helen J. (ed.) The Chronicle of the Third Crusade: The Itinerarium Peregrinorum et Gesta Regis Ricardi, 1997, 
 Usseglio, Leopoldo. I Marchesi di Monferrato in Italia ed in Oriente durante i secoli XII e XIII, 1926.

|-

1172 births
1205 deaths
12th-century kings of Jerusalem
13th-century kings of Jerusalem
12th-century women rulers
13th-century women rulers
13th century in Cyprus
Cypriot queens consort
Queens regnant of Jerusalem
Christians of the Third Crusade
Women of the Crusader states
Countesses of Champagne
Marchionesses of Montferrat